Katarzyna de Lazari-Radek (born 7 August 1975) is a Polish utilitarian philosopher and an assistant professor at the Institute of Philosophy at University of Łódź.

She has also taught at a summer seminar on utilitarian ethics at the European Graduate School and Spring School for PhD students at the Dutch Research School of Philosophy. She is best known for her collaborations with the Australian philosopher Peter Singer.

In their 2012, 2014 and 2016 collaborations she and Singer set out to explain and defend act utilitarianism and suggest a resolution to what the late 19th century British philosopher Henry Sidgwick called “the profoundest problem of ethics", the apparent rationality of both ethical egoism and utilitarianism. She and Singer use an evolutionary debunking argument to damage egoism but leave utilitarianism unscathed. In On What Matters Vol 3. Oxford philosopher Derek Parfit (1942–2017) expressed the view that their argument against the rationality of egoism carried "some force" though, as Lazari-Radek and Singer themselves acknowledge, it is not "decisive".

Utilitarianism
In his review of Lazari-Radek and Singer's book, The Point of View of the Universe: Sidgwick and Contemporary Ethics (2014), philosopher Bart Schultz, director of the Civic Knowledge Project at the University of Chicago, describes de Lazari-Radek as “a rising star … of philosophical utilitarianism", stating that their “book might well represent the most significant statement and defense of act utilitarianism since the 19th century, when the classical utilitarianism of Bentham, Mill, and Sidgwick were the spirit of the age." De Lazari-Radek defends a form of act utilitarianism similar to that of Sidgwick whose work was the focus of her doctoral dissertation entitled “Good and Reason in the Moral Philosophy of Henry Sidgwick (2007)."

De Lazari-Radek also draws insights from more contemporary thinkers like Parfit who classified her and Singer's view that we have most reason to do whatever would be impartially best as a form of "Rational Impartialism".

In July 2017 her and Singer's second book was published Utilitarianism: A Very Short Introduction, of which Jeff McMahan, White's Professor of Moral Philosophy, Oxford University, has said: "Written with characteristic clarity by the acknowledged heirs of the founders of utilitarianism, this discussion is authoritative, sympathetic though not uncritical, and remarkably comprehensive - in a word, ideal."

Hedonism
De Lazari-Radek explains her normative position as a hedonistic utilitarian. She persuaded Singer to embrace hedonism instead of preference utilitarianism during their collaboration on The Point of View of the Universe.
She is exploring the matter more carefully in her two upcoming books on well-being and pleasure in Polish and English.

Personal life
De Lazari-Radek lives and works in Łódź, Poland. She is married and has two children. Apart from being a philosopher she is an enthusiastic jogger and gardener.

Publications
 Rationing in medicine - recenzja, 2002
 Prorok wśród swoich, 2004
 W poszukiwaniu złotego środka, 2007
 Singer kontratakuje, 2009
 Konsekwencjalizm i tajemnica: obrona ezoterycznej moralności, 2013
 The Point of View of the Universe: Sidgwick and Contemporary Ethics (with Peter Singer), Oxford University Press, 2014
 Utilitarianism: A Very Short Introduction (with Peter Singer), Oxford University Press, 2017

See also
  Utilitarianism
  Act Utilitarianism
  Hedonism

References

1975 births
Living people
21st-century Polish philosophers
Analytic philosophers
Atheist philosophers
Consequentialists
Hedonism
Polish atheists
Polish women philosophers
Academic staff of the University of Łódź
Utilitarians